Marcelo Fabián Domínguez (born January 15, 1970) is an Argentine professional boxer. A world champion and four-time world title challenger at cruiserweight, he held the WBC world cruiserweight title from 1996 until 1998. He originally won the interim WBC belt in 1995, having been promoted after his second defense of the belt that same year.

Professional career
Domínguez turned pro in 1991 and was able to land a title shot in only his sixteenth fight, against Anaclet Wamba in 1994 for the WBC cruiserweight title. Wamba won a majority decision. Domínguez was able to capture the interim WBC belt the following year though with a TKO win over Akim Tafer. He was able to defend the belt five times, being promoted to full champ along the way, before losing the belt to Juan Carlos Gómez in 1998 via decision. Domínguez rematched Gómez in 1999, and again came up short in a decision. In 2001, he was able to land a shot at WBO cruiserweight title holder Johnny Nelson, but lost a decision.

Domínguez later moved up to heavyweight and after drifting into obscurity for several years and fighting for fringe titles, Domínguez lined up a shot for the WBO interim cruiserweight title against Enzo Maccarinelli, but was TKO'd.

Dominguez retired after 2006, but returned in 2013.

Professional boxing record

{|class="wikitable" style="text-align:center"
|-
!
!Result
!Record
!Opponent
!Type
!Round, time
!Date
!Location
!Notes
|-align=center
|57
|Win
|48-8-1
|align=left| Nelson Dario Dominguez
|UD
|6 
|7 Mar 2015
|align=left|
|align=left|
|-align=center
|56
|Loss
|47-8-1
|align=left| Matias Ariel Vidondo
|TKO
|2 (10)
|11 Oct 2014
|align=left|
|align=left|
|-align=center
|55
|Win
|47-7-1
|align=left| Javier Corrales
|KO
|2 (8)
|19 Jun 2014
|align=left|
|align=left|
|-align=center
|54
|Win
|46-7-1
|align=left| Manuel Alberto Pucheta
|UD
|8
|15 Mar 2014
|align=left|
|align=left|
|-align=center
|53
|Win
|45-7-1
|align=left| Martin David Islas
|UD
|8
|14 Dec 2013
|align=left|
|align=left|
|-align=center
|52
|Win
|44-7-1
|align=left| Hector Alfredo Avila
|TKO
|7 (10)
|31 Aug 2013
|align=left|
|
|-align=center
|51
|Win
|43-7-1
|align=left| Miguel Angel Morales
|UD
|8
|15 Jun 2013
|align=left|
|align=left|
|-align=center
|50
|Win
|42-7-1
|align=left| Alfredo Brigido Ruiz Diaz
|TKO
|7 (10), 
|3 May 2013
|align=left|
|align=left|
|-align=center
|49
|Win
|41-7-1
|align=left| Fabio Eduardo Moli
|TKO
|6 (12), 
|2 Dec 2006
|align=left|
|align=left|
|-align=center
|48
|Loss
|40-7-1
|align=left| Enzo Maccarinelli
|TKO
|9 (12), 
|8 Jul 2006
|align=left|
|align=left|
|-align=center
|47
|Win
|40-6-1
|align=left| Mariano Ramon Ocampo
|UD
|10
|3 Feb 2006
|align=left|
|align=left|
|-align=center
|46
|Win
|39-6-1
|align=left| Fabio Eduardo Moli
|
|7 (12), 
|12 Aug 2005
|align=left|
|align=left|
|-align=center
|45
|Win
|38-6-1
|align=left| Carlos Javier Ojeda Roldan
|TKO
|10 (12)
|22 Apr 2005
|align=left|
|align=left|
|-align=center
|44
|Loss
|37-6-1
|align=left| Cengiz Koc
|UD
|8
|18 Dec 2004
|align=left|
|align=left|
|-align=center
|43
|Loss
|37-5-1
|align=left| Nikolay Valuev
|UD
|8
|17 Apr 2004
|align=left|
|align=left|
|-
|-align=center
|42
|Win
|37-4-1
|align=left| Edegar Da Silva
|RTD
|4 (12)
|6 Dec 2003
|align=left|
|align=left|
|-align=center
|41
|Win
|36-4-1
|align=left| Miguel Angel Antonio Aguirre
|UD
|10
|1 Mar 2003
|align=left|
|align=left|
|-align=center
|40
|Win
|35-4-1
|align=left| Fabio Eduardo Moli
|UD
|12
|19 Oct 2002
|align=left|
|align=left|
|-
|-align=center
|39
|Win
|34-4-1
|align=left| Eduardo Andres Sandivares
|KO
|3 (12)
|27 Jul 2002
|align=left|
|align=left|
|-align=center
|38
|Win
|33-4-1
|align=left| Pedro Daniel Franco
|UD
|12
|11 May 2002
|align=left|
|align=left|
|-align=center
|37
|Loss
|32-4-1
|align=left| Johnny Nelson
|UD
|12
|21 Jul 2001
|align=left|
|align=left|
|-align=center
|36
|Win
|32-3-1
|align=left| Jose Gomes
|UD
|10
|26 May 2001
|align=left|
|align=left|
|-align=center
|35
|Win
|31-3-1
|align=left| George Arias
|UD
|10
|4 Nov 2000
|align=left|
|align=left|
|-align=center
|34
|Win
|30-3-1
|align=left| Miguel Angel Antonio Aguirre
|UD
|10
|29 Apr 2000
|align=left|
|align=left|
|-align=center
|33
|Win
|29-3-1
|align=left| Ken Hulsey
|TKO
|3 (10)
|4 Dec 1999
|align=left|
|align=left|
|-align=center
|32
|Win
|28-3-1
|align=left| Argemiro Antonio Dos Santos
|RTD
|3 (10)
|2 Oct 1999
|align=left|
|align=left|

|-align=center
|31
|Win
|27-3-1
|align=left| Ignacio Monzon Zarza
|TKO
|3 (12)
|21 Aug 1999
|align=left|
|align=left|
|-align=center
|30
|Loss
|26-3-1
|align=left| Juan Carlos Gomez
|UD
|12
|13 Mar 1999
|align=left|
|align=left|
|-align=center
|29
|Win
|26-2-1
|align=left| Miguel Angel Robledo
|UD
|10
|14 Nov 1998
|align=left|
|align=left|
|-align=center
|28
|Win
|25-2-1
|align=left| Miguel Angel Antonio Aguirre
|UD
|10
|9 Oct 1998
|align=left|
|align=left|
|-align=center
|27
|Win
|24-2-1
|align=left| Ricardo Alfredo Ibarra
|
|7 (10)
|11 Sep 1998
|align=left|
|align=left|
|-align=center
|26
|Win
|23-2-1
|align=left| Angel Amarilla Garcia
|TKO
|3 (10)
|7 Aug 1998
|align=left|
|align=left|
|-align=center
|25
|Loss
|22-2-1
|align=left| Juan Carlos Gomez
|UD
|12
|21 Feb 1998
|align=left|
|align=left|
|-align=center
|24
|Win
|22-1-1
|align=left| Akim Tafer
|UD
|12
|16 Aug 1997
|align=left|
|align=left|
|-align=center
|23
|Win
|21-1-1
|align=left| Jose Arimatea Da Silva
|
|8 (12)
|6 Dec 1996
|align=left|
|align=left|
|-align=center
|22
|Win
|20-1-1
|align=left| Patrice Aouissi
|TKO
|10 (12)
|5 Jul 1996
|align=left|
|align=left|
|-align=center
|21
|Win
|19-1-1
|align=left| Sergei Kobozev
|
|12
|24 Oct 1995
|align=left|
|align=left|
|-align=center
|20
|Win
|18-1-1
|align=left| Reinaldo Gimenez
|
|12
|2 Sep 1995
|align=left|
|align=left|
|-align=center
|19
|Win
|17-1-1
|align=left| Akim Tafer
|TKO
|9 (12)
|25 Jul 1995
|align=left|
|align=left|
|-align=center
|18
|Win
|16-1-1
|align=left| Luiz Delmiro Alves
|KO
|4 (10)
|1 Jul 1995
|align=left|
|align=left|
|-align=center
|17
|Win
|15-1-1
|align=left| Carlton West
|TKO
|3 (10)
|14 Apr 1995
|align=left|
|align=left|
|-align=center
|16
|Loss
|14-1-1
|align=left| Anaclet Wamba
|MD
|12
|3 Dec 1994
|align=left|
|align=left|
|-align=center
|15
|Win
|14-0-1
|align=left| Juan Alberto Barrero
|UD
|10
|8 Sep 1994
|align=left|
|align=left|
|-align=center
|14
|Win
|13-0-1
|align=left| Oscar Alfredo Gonzalez
|UD
|12
|30 Aug 1994
|align=left|
|align=left|
|-align=center
|13
|Win
|12-0-1
|align=left| Eduardo Luiz Dos Santos
|KO
|4 (10)
|28 Jul 1994
|align=left|
|align=left|
|-align=center
|12
|Win
|11-0-1
|align=left| Miguel Angel Antonio Aguirre
|UD
|8
|14 May 1994
|align=left|
|align=left|
|-align=center
|11
|Win
|10-0-1
|align=left| Miguel Angel Robledo
|UD
|8
|28 Apr 1994
|align=left|
|
|-align=center
|10
|Win
|9-0-1
|align=left| Ricardo Alfredo Ibarra
|TKO
|8 (12)
|30 Oct 1993
|align=left|
|align=left|
|-align=center
|9
|Win
|8-0-1
|align=left| Joao de Deus Silva
|KO
|1 (8)
|10 Sep 1993
|align=left|
|align=left|
|-align=center
|8
|Win
|7-0-1
|align=left| Oscar Alfredo Gonzalez
|UD
|8
|1 May 1993
|align=left|
|align=left|
|-align=center
|7
|Win
|6-0-1
|align=left| Nestor Hipolito Giovannini
|DQ
|4 (12)
|20 Feb 1993
|align=left|
|align=left|
|-align=center
|6
|Win
|5-0-1
|align=left| Miguel Angel Antonio Aguirre
|UD
|8
|9 Dec 1992
|align=left|
|align=left|
|-align=center
|5
|Win
|4-0-1
|align=left| Oscar Angel Gomez
|TKO
|6 (6), 
|18 Nov 1992
|align=left|
|align=left|
|-align=center
|4
|Win
|3-0-1
|align=left| Alberto Valerio Jorge Arias
|KO
|2 (8), 
|39 Sep 1992
|align=left|
|align=left|
|-align=center
|3
|Draw
|2-0-1
|align=left| Raul Andres Aguiar
|PTS
|10
|7 Aug 1992
|align=left|
|align=left|
|-align=center
|2
|Win
|2-0
|align=left| Juan Carlos Belizan
|UD
|6
|8 Nov 1991
|align=left|
|align=left|
|-align=center
|1
|Win
|1-0
|align=left| Gustavo Jorge Vazquez
|KO
|4 (6)
|4 Oct 1991
|align=left|
|align=left|

References

External links
 

Living people
1970 births
Argentine male boxers
Cruiserweight boxers
Heavyweight boxers
World Boxing Council champions
World cruiserweight boxing champions
People from Ituzaingó Partido
Sportspeople from Buenos Aires Province